Runaruna Mud Volcano as a distinct and true mud volcano landform is considered a national geological place of interest in New Zealand. Several geological processes may cause the formation of mud volcanoes including elsewhere in New Zealand geothermal mud pools or mudpots. It is located just southwest of Broadwood on private property.

References

Geological Society of New Zealand
Kroadcottage
 Department of Conservation

Landforms of the Northland Region
Volcanoes of the Northland Region
Far North District
Mud volcanoes